The 1952 Boston College Eagles football team represented Boston College as an independent during the 1952 college football season. Led by second-year head coach Mike Holovak, the Eagles compiled a record of 4–4–1. Boston College played home games at Braves Field in Boston, Massachusetts.

Schedule

References

Boston College
Boston College Eagles football seasons
Boston College Eagles football
1950s in Boston